Domenico Tojetti (1807–1892) was an Italian American painter.

Born in Rocca di Papa, near Rome, the artist frequented the Roman circle of the Torlonia Princes, providing frescos in the ballroom of Villa Torlonia under the direction of his teacher, Francesco Coghetti.

The artist provided also frescoes in the churches of Rome, including the Basilica di San Paolo fuori le Mura and Sant'Agnese fuori le Mura. In this period he developed friendships with Constantino Brumidi, who moved to the United States in 1852, and with Leonardo Massabò.

Domenico Tojetti had a son in 1849. Virgilio Tojetti  was born in Italy. He studied under his father and later in Paris under Gerome and Bouguereau.  Virgilio became known for his frescos and genre scene paintings and exhibited widely. He painted murals in the Savoy Hotel, Hoffman House and others in New York City.

In 1867 Tojetti moved with his family to Guatemala, then Mexico, and finally to San Francisco, California, where he produced paintings for churches, public and private buildings.

He died in San Francisco in 1892.

References

1807 births
1892 deaths
People from the Metropolitan City of Rome Capital
19th-century Italian painters
Italian male painters
19th-century American painters
American male painters
Religious artists
Italian emigrants to the United States
19th-century Italian male artists
19th-century American male artists